(The) Destruction of Jerusalem may refer to:

 The Destruction of Jerusalem (70 AD)
 The Siege of Jerusalem (587 BC)
 The Destruction of Jerusalem (play), a 17th-century play by John Crowne
 The Destruction of Jerusalem (painting), a 1637 painting by Nicolas Poussin
 Die Zerstörung Jerusalems (The Destruction of Jerusalem), oratorio by Ferdinand Hiller (1840).